Pannu Mazara is a village in Shaheed Bhagat Singh Nagar district of Punjab State, India. The village is administrated by Sarpanch an elected representative of the village. Most of the villagers are settled in the foreign countries. Many people are well settled and highly educated. Some are teachers, doctors and many have other business. But there are still some villagers are not educated. Along with this, as this is very near to the city so masses do not get any kind of problem in essential household things. According to Harwinder Kaur a resident of this village some of the people believe in caste and Creed system but still there are many kind hearted persons here. Roads needs to be reconstruct as villagers get problems regarding this.

Demography 
As of 2011, Pannu Mazara has a total number of 311 houses and population of 1368 of which 680 include are males while 688 are females according to the report published by Census India in 2011. The literacy rate of Pannu Mazara is 82.32% higher than the state average of 75.84%. The population of children under the age of 6 years is 118 which is 8.63% of total population of Pannu Mazara, and child sex ratio is approximately 1185 as compared to Punjab state average of 846.

Most of the people are from Schedule Caste which constitutes 34.21% of total population in Pannu Mazara. The town does not have any Schedule Tribe population so far.

As per the report published by Census India in 2011, 511 people were engaged in work activities out of the total population of Pannu Mazara which includes 448 males and 63 females. According to census survey report 2011, 66.93% workers describe their work as main work and 33.07% workers are involved in Marginal activity providing livelihood for less than 6 months.

Education 
The village has a Punjabi medium, co-ed primary school established in 1955. The school provide mid-day meal as per Indian Midday Meal Scheme. As per Right of Children to Free and Compulsory Education Act the school provide free education to children between the ages of 6 and 14.

KC Engineering College and Doaba Khalsa Trust Group Of Institutions are the nearest colleges.

List of schools nearby:
Govt Senior Secondary School, Ladhana Jhikka
Dashmesh Model School, Kahma
Govt High School, Jhander Kalan
Govt Gigh School, Khan Khana
Guru Ram Dass Public School, Cheta

Transport 
But the thing is in day to day life there is not proper service of buses and autos because of this people get problems.

See also 
List of villages in India

References

External links 
 Tourism of Punjab
 Census of Punjab
 Locality Based PINCode

Villages in Shaheed Bhagat Singh Nagar district